Željko Šturanović (31 January 1960 – 30 June 2014) was a Montenegrin politician who was the Prime Minister of Montenegro from 2006 until his resignation in 2008.

Early life
Šturanović was born in Nikšić, in what was then the People's Republic of Montenegro, part of the Federal People's Republic of Yugoslavia.

Prime Minister of Montenegro

Appointment as Prime Minister
Šturanović served as Minister of Justice in Prime Minister Milo Đukanović's government. After Đukanović's announcement on 3 October 2006 that he would not accept the nomination for the position of Prime Minister again, Šturanović was selected as a candidate for the position by the leaders of his party the following day. He was welcomed even by Montenegrin Opposition, which is otherwise known to be a harsh critic of the ruling coalition.

Šturanović and his government were elected by the Montenegrin parliament on November 10, 2006. The 14-member government, including two deputy prime ministers, was approved by a 42 to 28 vote. Šturanović was sworn in on the same day.

Premiership and resignation
On the eve of January 20, 2007, Šturanović was in Belgrade at Boris Tadić's Democratic Party during its campaign for the parliamentary election.

After becoming Prime Minister, he was diagnosed as having a rare tumour of the lung but was for the time being considered fit to continue as Prime Minister.  At the time DPS President and former Prime Minister Đukanović assisted him in his administrative duties.

Šturanović signed the Stabilization and Association Agreement on behalf of the Government of Montenegro on 15 March 2007.

He resigned on 31 January 2008 for health reasons, saying that the therapy he was prescribed required him to work much less than would be possible while serving as Prime Minister.
 He remained in office until Đukanović was approved by Parliament and sworn in at the end of February. He died in Paris at the age of 54 on 30 June 2014.

Cabinet

References

External links
 Biography on DPS Official Website
 The Njegoskij Fund Network: Resignation letter of Prime Minister Sturanovic to the Parliament of Montenegro

1960 births
2014 deaths
Politicians from Nikšić
Democratic Party of Socialists of Montenegro politicians
Prime Ministers of Montenegro
Members of the Parliament of Montenegro
University of Montenegro Faculty of Law alumni
Deaths from lung cancer